Charles Rudolph Trefusis, 19th Baron Clinton (9 November 1791 – 10 April 1866), styled The Honourable Charles Trefusis between 1794 and 1832, was a British peer and Tory politician. He succeeded to the barony following the death of his elder brother.

Background and education
Clinton was the second son of Robert Trefusis, 17th Baron Clinton, and his wife Albertina Marianna Gaulis. She was the daughter of Jean Abraham Rodolph Gaulis (died 1788) of Lausanne, Switzerland, an important magistrate of that city. Her mother was Jeanne-Louise-Dorothée Porta, from another prominent Lausanne family. Her eldest brother, Clinton's uncle, was Abram Frederic Louis Juste Gaulis, a member of the Grand Council of Vaud and the heir and custodian of the Château de Colombier-sur-Morges, near Lausanne. Another of his Swiss uncles was Charles Gaulis (died in Germany 23 August 1796), who fathered a child by Mary Jane de Vial (later Clairmont). Clinton's cousin, Charles Gaulis Clairmont, who grew up as stepbrother to Mary Shelley, ended up as Chair of English literature at Vienna University

Clinton was early orphaned: his father died in 1797 and his mother in 1798.

Clinton was educated at Eton and Oriel College, Oxford.

Political career
Clinton was elected Member of Parliament for Callington in 1813, a seat he held until 1818. Between 1819 and 1833 he was a Commissioner of Excise. In 1832 he succeeded his elder brother, Robert Cotton St John Trefusis, 18th Baron Clinton (1787–1832) as baron. This meant that he left the Commons and entered the House of Lords.

Marriage and children
Lord Clinton married in 1831 Lady Elizabeth Georgiana Kerr daughter of William Kerr, 6th Marquess of Lothian. They had four sons and seven daughters, including:

 Hon Emily born 6 September 1832
Charles Hepburn-Stuart-Forbes-Trefusis, 20th Baron Clinton, his eldest son and heir.
Mark George Kerr Trefusis (1836–1907), his second son, who in 1852 adopted by royal licence the surname and arms of Rolle following his inheritance of a life-interest in the estate of his maternal uncle John Rolle, 1st Baron Rolle (1756–1842), which made him the largest land-owner in Devon. The Rolle estate descended from him to his nephew Charles John Robert Hepburn-Stuart-Forbes-Trefusis, 21st Baron Clinton (1863–1957).
Colonel Hon. Walter Rodolph Trefusis (1838-1885), Colonel of the 2nd Battalion, Scots Guards and Companion, Order of the Bath (C.B.); one of his five daughters (no sons), Marion, married Thomas Coke, 4th Earl of Leicester.
Colonel Hon. John Schomberg Trefusis (1852-1932), commanding officer of the 4th Battalion (1st Devon Militia), Devonshire Regiment, his last son and child; his son Denys married Violet Keppel.

Death
He died in April 1866, aged 74, and was succeeded in the barony by his eldest son Charles Hepburn-Stuart-Forbes-Trefusis, 20th Baron Clinton. His widow died in March 1871, aged 63.

References

1791 births
1866 deaths
People educated at Eton College
Alumni of Oriel College, Oxford
Members of the Parliament of the United Kingdom for Callington
UK MPs 1812–1818
Clinton, B19
Barons Clinton